The Ayrton Senna bridge is a bridge in over the Rio Paraná in Brazil. It was inaugurated on 24 January 1998 and cost R$32 million. It carries the BR-163 trunk road from Guaíra in Paraná to Mundo Novo in Mato Grosso do Sul.
The bridge is named after Brazilian racing driver, Ayrton Senna da Silva.

References

Bridges over the Paraná River
Bridges in Brazil